William Alexander Fergusson (2 March 1897 – 1986) was an English footballer who played as a centre forward for Oldham Athletic, Rochdale, Reading and Rotherham United. Throughout his career he scored 30 goals in 69 matches and was top goal scorer for Rochdale in the 1925–26 season.

References

Oldham Athletic A.F.C. players
Rochdale A.F.C. players
Reading F.C. players
Rotherham United F.C. players
People from Willenhall
English footballers
1897 births
1986 deaths
Association footballers not categorized by position